Francesca Melandri (born Rome, 1964) is an Italian novelist, screenwriter, and documentary filmmaker. She was the recipient of the Rapallo Carige Prize for Più alto del mare in 2012.

She started writing very young, working first as a screenwriter, and has worked on films and television series, as well as a number of prize winning documentaries.

In 2010 she published her first novel, Eva dorme (Eva Sleeps), set in the border regions of Northern Italy and Austria, a sweeping story about family, forgiveness, conflict and the search for truth. The novel, which won several literary prizes in 2010 and 2011, was translated into English by Katherine Gregor (2016), as well as into German, Dutch and French.

Melandri's second novel, Più alto del mare was published in 2012 and it has also won several literary prizes.

References

Italian women novelists
21st-century Italian women writers
21st-century Italian novelists
Italian women screenwriters
Italian screenwriters
Italian documentary filmmakers
Italian women film directors
Women documentary filmmakers
Writers from Rome
Film directors from Rome
1964 births
Living people
21st-century Italian screenwriters